The 2013–14 Duquesne Dukes men's basketball team represented Duquesne University during the 2013–14 NCAA Division I men's basketball season. The Dukes, led by second year head coach Jim Ferry, played their home games at the A. J. Palumbo Center and were members of the Atlantic 10 Conference. They finished the season 13–17, 5–11 in A-10 play to finish in a tie for tenth place. They lost in the second round of the A-10 tournament to Richmond.

Roster

Schedule

|-
!colspan=9 style="background:#00214D; color:#CC0000;"| Exhibition

|-
!colspan=9 style="background:#00214D; color:#CC0000;"| Regular season

|-
!colspan=9 style="background:#00214D; color:#CC0000;"| Atlantic 10 tournament

References

Duquesne
Duquesne Dukes men's basketball seasons
2013 in sports in Pennsylvania
2014 in sports in Pennsylvania